Rhododendron lapponicum (高山杜鹃), the Lapland rosebay, is a dwarf rhododendron species found in subarctic regions of North America, Europe and Asia, where it grows at altitudes ranging from sea level to . The flowers are reddish or purple.

Despite numerous attempts, this dwarf species has proved difficult to cultivate, possibly because it requires very cool, moist conditions and snow cover for part of the year.

References

 "Rhododendron lapponicum", (Linnaeus) Wahlenberg, Fl. Lapp. 104. 1812.
 The Plant List
 Flora of China
 Hirsutum.com

lapponicum
Plants described in 1753
Taxa named by Carl Linnaeus